Mahak Jain (born 24 June 2001) is an inactive Indian tennis player.

Mahak has a career-high singles ranking by the Women's Tennis Association (WTA) of 511, achieved on 18 February 2019. She also has a career-high doubles ranking of world No. 820, reached on 14 January 2019.

On the ITF Junior Circuit, Mahak has a career-high combined ranking of 29, achieved on 5 June 2017.

Mahak made her Fed Cup debut for India in 2019.

ITF finals

Singles: 5 (2 titles, 3 runner–ups)

Doubles: 1 (1 title)

Fed Cup participation

Singles

References

External links
 
 
 

2001 births
Living people
Indian female tennis players
Sportspeople from Bhopal
Sportspeople from Indore